The following is a list of hospitals in the Volta Region of Ghana as well as Health Centres.

The Volta Region has a population of 1,955.371. The population density is 87 square kilometres with 30% of the population living in urban areas. It is divided into 18 administrative districts with Ho as the regional capital. There are a total of 2,752 communities in the region.

The region has a Regional Health Directorate which has oversight for the health facilities in the region. Under this are 18 municipal and district health directorates and a total of 84 health sub-districts.

Districs

Adaklu District
 Adaklu Waya Health Centre, Adaklu Waya
 Hasu Community Polyclinic, Hasu, Ghana

Agotime-Ziope District
 Agotime Kpetoe Clinic, Kpetoe

Akatsi South District
 Akatsi District Hospital, Akatsi
 Hoggar Clinic Ltd, Akatsi
 St. Paul's Hospital, Akatsi

Anloga District
  International Health and Development Network (IHDN) Mission Hospital, Agbozume

Central Tongu District
 Adidome Hospital, Adidome

Ho Municipal District
 Foresight Medical Centre, Ho
 Ho Municipal Hospital, Ho
 Ho Royal Hospital, Ho
 Ho Teaching Hospital, Ho (Regional Hospital and Teaching Hospital with the University of Health and Allied Sciences).

Ho West District
 Akrofu Xeviwofe Health Centre, Akrofu
 Have Health Centre, Have
 Nazareth Hospital, Vane
 St. Francis Catholic Hospital 
 Kpedze Hospital, Kpedze
 Tsito Health Centre, Tsito

Hohoe Municipal District
 Cedar Medical Centre, Hohoe
 Hohoe Municipal Hospital, Hohoe

Keta Municipal District
 Keta District Hospital, Keta
 Sacred Heart Hospital, Abor
 Wellspan Health, Abor

Ketu North Municipal District
 Saint Anthony's Hospital, Dzodze
 Ketu North Municipal Hospital, Weta

Ketu South Municipal District
 Central Aflao Hospital, Aflao
 Ketu South Municipal Hospital, Aflao
 New Hope Clinic, Viepe, Aflao
 King's Hand Hospital Ltd, Tokor, Denu

Kpando Municipal District
 Margaret Marquart Catholic Hospital, Kpando
 St. Patrick Hospital, Kpando

North Dayi District
 Anfoega Catholic Hospital, Anfoega

North Tongu District
 Adidome Government Hospital, Adidome
 Catholic Hospital, Battor
 Evangelical Presbyterian Church Hospital, Adidome

South Dayi District
 Adzokoe Health Centre
 Dzemini E. P. Clinic
 Kpalime Duga Health Centre
 Peki Dzake Health Centre, Peki
 Peki Government Hospital, Peki
 Salem Maternity Home
 Tongor Tsanekpe Health Centre
 Tsate Community-Based Health Planning and Services (CHPS) Zone
 Tsiyinu CHPS Zone
 Wegbe Kpalime Health Centre

South Tongu District
 Government Hospital, Sogakope
 Richard Novati Catholic Hospital, Sogakope

See also
 Healthcare in Ghana
 List of hospitals in Ghana
 National Health Insurance Scheme (Ghana)

References

External links
Ghana Health Service Official Website
The Health Sector in Ghana - Facts and Figures 2005

List
Hospitals in Volta